As of November 2019, Lao Airlines serves a total of 23 destinations in Asia. It does not include interline flights.

Destinations

References

Lao Airlines
Lao Airlines